This is a discography of the recordings of Vespro della Beata Vergine by Claudio Monteverdi – also known as his Vespers of 1610. Since the first vinyl recordings of the work in 1953, the Vespers have been recorded in numerous versions. Some versions are choral-based, others use one voice per part (OVPP). Some versions use modern instruments, but since the first recording on period instruments appeared in the 1960s their use has become normal. Sir John Eliot Gardiner has recorded the Vespers with both modern and period instruments, explaining that the latter are now played to a higher standard than when he made his first recording in the 1970s. In the late 1970s the Monteverdi orchestra, which he founded, transitioned to period instruments and became the English Baroque Soloists.

The recordings also reflect the fact that there is a debate about whether the Vespers were originally performed as a single work.
Sometimes it has been decided to add material or omit items in order to replicate a church service.
In a few cases, for example the Stevens recording, the "sacred concertos" that divide the psalms are replaced by antiphonal chants.

In the list, the "Year" column indicates year of initial issue of each recording. For pre-1982 recordings, details of the first compact disc issue are included; thereafter, all issues refer to CDs.  Where the date of recording is significantly earlier than the issue date, a note has been added. Many of the recordings have been reissued, sometimes multiple times, often under different labels – reissue details are not included.

List of recordings

Notes and references
Notes

Citations

Sources
 
 

Discographies of classical compositions
 Compositions by Claudio Monteverdi